John Kladas ( Ioannis Kladas) was a Byzantine composer. He had the post of lampadarius in the cathedral of Hagia Sophia of Constantinople. He wrote several works on the theory of music, the most important being the Grammatike tes mousikes (The Grammar of Music).

His daughter was a chanter and hymnographer, known only from one composition.

References

Sources

Further reading
Manuel Chrysaphes (1985) The treatise of Manuel Chrysaphes, the lampadarios: On the theory of the art of chanting and on certain erroneous views that some hold about it (Mount Athos, Iviron Monastery MS 1120, July 1458), in Monumenta musicae byzantinae, vol. 2, pp. 45, 79, 83 (snippets available)
Apostolike Diakonia tes Ekklesias tes Hellados, Digitalization of Byzantine Music, Archive of Konstantinos Priggos. In Greek.

14th-century births
15th-century deaths
14th-century Byzantine people
15th-century Byzantine people
Byzantine hymnographers
Byzantine composers
14th-century Greek musicians
15th-century Greek musicians